Archbishop Shaw may refer to:  

 John Shaw (archbishop) (1863–1934), a Roman Catholic archbishop 
 Archbishop Shaw High School, a high school in Marrero, Louisiana